Azoarcus anaerobius is a gram-negative, strictly anaerobic, catalase-negative, nitrate-reducing, rod-shaped bacterium from the genus of Azoarcus.

References

External links
Type strain of Azoarcus anaerobius at BacDive -  the Bacterial Diversity Metadatabase

Rhodocyclaceae
Bacteria described in 1998